Bisley-with-Lypiatt is a civil parish in the Stroud district of Gloucestershire, England.  It had a population of 2350 in 2019.  It includes Bisley, Lypiatt, Eastcombe and Oakridge.

Parishes adjoining Bisley-with-Lypiatt are: Miserden to the north; Edgeworth to the north-east; Duntisbourne Rouse to the east; Sapperton to the south-east; Chalford to the south; Thrupp to the south-west; Stroud to the west; and Painswick to the north-west. Of these, Edgeworth, Duntisbourne Rouse and Sapperton are in the Cotswold district, the remainder in Stroud.

References

External links

NOMIS - Official Labour market statistics
Parish homepage of Bisley-with-Lypiatt
List of parishes in Stroud

Civil parishes in Gloucestershire
Stroud District